RaftLib is a portable parallel processing system that aims to provide extreme performance while increasing programmer productivity. It enables a programmer to assemble a massively parallel program (both local and distributed) using simple iostream-like operators. RaftLib handles threading, memory allocation, memory placement, and auto-parallelization of compute kernels. It enables applications to be constructed from chains of compute kernels forming a task and pipeline parallel compute graph. Programs are authored in C++ (although other language bindings are planned).

Example
Here is a Hello World example for demonstration purposes:

#include <raft>
#include <raftio>
#include <cstdlib>
#include <string>

class hi : public raft::kernel
{
public:
    hi() : raft::kernel()
    {
       output.addPort< std::string >( "0" ); 
    }

    virtual raft::kstatus run()
    {
        output[ "0" ].push( std::string( "Hello World\n" ) );
        return( raft::stop ); 
    }
};

int
main( int argc, char **argv )
{
    /** instantiate print kernel **/
    raft::print< std::string > p;
    /** instantiate hello world kernel **/
    hi hello;
    /** make a map object **/
    raft::map m;
    /** add kernels to map, both hello and p are executed concurrently **/
    m += hello >> p;
    /** execute the map **/
    m.exe();
    return( EXIT_SUCCESS );
}

References

External links
 The RaftLib Project Page
 RaftLib User Wiki
 Project GitHub Repository
 CPPNow RaftLib Tutorial Session
 A Short Introduction to Stream Processing
 Parallel BZip2 Implementation Using RaftLib

C++ programming language family